Rahul Banerjee may refer to:

Rahul Banerjee (actor) (born 1983), Indian actor
Rahul Banerjee (archer) (born 1986), Indian archer
Rahul Banerjee (chemist) (born 1978), Indian chemist